The E1000, commonly known as the PP Tze-chiang, is a series of electric push-pull trains used by the Taiwan Railways Administration (TRA), operated as part of the Tze-chiang limited express service. The locomotives were built by Union Carriage & Wagon and GEC-Alsthom, while the passenger cars were built by Hyundai Precision & Industries and Tang Eng Iron Works.

History
The E1000 series was built to replace the EMU100 series. In 1994, the TRA came to an agreement with Hyundai Precision & Industries to build 64 locomotives and 400 passenger cars for $7.2 billion NTD. Hyundai manufactured the passenger cars, while the locomotives were built by Union Carriage & Wagon and GEC-Alsthom. The first arrived in April 1996 and passenger services commenced on September 26 of the same year.

At the time of the units' arrival, trains were popular since they were first to use a streamlined design, contrasting with the boxy design of its predecessor. However, the TRA soon reported that the trains suffered from frequent traction motor failures and insufficient power delivery due to poor maintenance, oftentimes requiring a third locomotive to be attached to the rear as a backup.  Due to the poor quality of stainless-steel painting processes at the time of production, the coaches were also not painted, but rather had stickers applied, which began to fade, mottle, and peel after exposure to weather and sunshine in service.  The multitude of problems plaguing the class earned them the derisive nickname "Beggar Gang Train" among enthusiasts and the press. The poor state of repair, combined with paying-off of the maintenance contract's performance bond following Hyundai's merger with Rotem, and subsequent withdrawal of support staff from Taiwan in 2003, prompted TRA to sue the company in 2005 for $1.7 billion NTD in damages; however, the lawsuit never came to fruition.  Nevertheless, in response, Minister of Transportation and Communications Lin Ling-san banned South Korean companies from participating in future transportation bids until problems with the E1000 and other South Korean-produced equipment are resolved. The two reached an agreement of $300 million NTD in 2018.

By 2010, remedial work to the locomotives done under supervision of Alstom had improved reliability, and the carriages began undergoing repainting to resolve the paint issues.  Despite the problems, however, the E1000 series has been a regular fixture within the Tze-chiang family since entry into service owing to the large class size, and with the electrification of railroads, the E1000 has begun to replace DMU on East Coast Tze-chiang services. In a report from 2015, the TRA listed the E1000 series as one of the trains to be replaced in the near future as it approaches its 30-year lifespan.

Features

The E1000 series is configured in a push-pull arrangement, with a locomotive at each end of the train. The trains are designed to run in 12-15 passenger car configurations. The bogies were supplied by Krauss-Maffei, while the braking system are supplied by Knorr-Bremse.

Dining cars and reconfiguration
Originally, the E1000 series featured 32 dining cars. When the TRA phased out on-board dining, the cars were briefly used as baggage cars. Currently, 11 of the dining cars are reconfigured as handicapped-accessible passenger cars, while 20 of the cars are reconfigured as "family cars', which feature a different seat layout, a children's play area, and breastfeeding rooms.

See also
Taroko Express
Puyuma Express

References

External links

Passenger rail transportation in Taiwan
Train-related introductions in 1996
Alstom multiple units
Hyundai Rotem multiple units
Electric multiple units with locomotive-like power cars
25 kV AC multiple units